The 2017–18 1. FC Magdeburg season is the 52nd season in the football club's history. The season covers a period from 1 July 2017 to 30 June 2018.

Players

Squad information

Friendly matches

Competitions

3. Liga

League table

Results summary

Results by round

Matches

DFB-Pokal

Saxony-Anhalt Cup

References

1. FC Magdeburg seasons
Magdeburg